Elvin J. Hansen (born 1 May 1950) is a Danish politician. He is a member of the Social Democrats, and was the mayor of Odder Municipality between 1998-2005 and again between 2010 and 2013. He has been in the municipal council of Odder Municipality since 1986.

References 

1950 births
Living people
Danish municipal councillors
Mayors of places in Denmark
People from Odder Municipality
Social Democrats (Denmark) politicians